The Khant are a Subcaste of the Koli community found in the India state of Gujarat.

History 
The Koli Khant subcaste was founded by Koli chief Sonang Mer,  who traveled from Sindh to Gujarat. He had twelve sons, one of whom was Dhan Mer, who founded Dhandhuka and Dhandhalpur. His other sons included Patal Khant, who conquered Petlad, and Mer Rana, who conquered Mahiyar in Junagadh. The most famous chief was Jesa Khant, who defeated the Rao Khengarji I of Junagadh with the help of Muhammad bin Tughluq. Khant Kolis is a branch of Mer Kolis.

Rebellion in Junagadh 
The rebellion was raised by Mansa Khant against the first Nawab of Junagadh State because the Nawab was Viceroy of Gujarat Sultanate under the Mughal empire. Khant Kolis captured Uparkot Fort and plundered surrounding villages. The Nawab was unable to prevent Kolis, so he sought help from an Arab Jamadar Sheikh Abdullah Zubaidi and Thakur of Gondal State. Their combined forces attacked, captured the troops at the fort, and suppressed the rebellion.

Princely state 
The Princely state of Ambliara was ruled by Hindus Khant Kolis of Chauhan dynasty. The rulers were famous for resistance to the troops of Gaekwad Baroda State.

Sant State 
The Khant Kolis saved the Sant State from Rajputs of Banswara State. In 1753, Ratana Singh of Sant State died, and Sisodia Rajput ruler of Banswara attacked Sant. He killed three princes, but the fourth prince named Badansingh escaped with Khant Kolis. The Banswara troops were established in Sant and annexed in Banswara. Prince Badansingh was nurtured by Khant Kolis, and when he came of age, Kolis attacked Banswara troops and drove them out of Sant. Afterward, Kolis enthroned Badan Singh as Rana at Sant.

Society 

The Khants have clans called the 56 attacks, such as the Dabhi, Baria, Parmar, Kandoliya, Zala, Gohil, Bheda, Sarvaiya, Deavla, Patriya, Bataviya, etc. Their claim to the Kshatriya status is generally acknowledged, and they are referred to as Pallavi Darbars. The Khants are agriculturists, but as small and marginal farmers, many are involved with agricultural wage labor.

See also 
 List of Koli people
 List of Koli states and clans

References 

Koli subcastes
Social groups of Gujarat
Indian castes
History of Gujarat